474640 Alicanto, provisionally designated , is a detached extreme trans-Neptunian object. It was discovered on 6 November 2004, by American astronomer Andrew C. Becker at Cerro Tololo Inter-American Observatory in Chile. It never gets closer than 47 AU from the Sun (near the outer edge of the main Kuiper belt) and averages more than 300 AU from the Sun. Its large eccentricity strongly suggests that it was gravitationally scattered onto its current orbit. Because it is, like all detached objects, outside the current gravitational influence of Neptune, how it came to have this orbit cannot yet be explained. It was named after Alicanto, a nocturnal bird in Chilean mythology.

Discovery and orbit 

Alicanto was discovered by American astronomer A. C. Becker with the ESSENCE supernova survey on 6 November 2004 observing with the 4-meter Blanco Telescope from Cerro Tololo Inter-American Observatory. Precovery images have been found back to September 26, 2000. Alicanto was observed by the Hubble Space Telescope in November 2008, and found not to have any detectable companions. It reached perihelion (closest approach to the Sun) in 2009 and is currently 47.7 AU from the Sun. It will be in the constellation of Cetus until 2019. It comes to opposition at the start of November.

With an perihelion greater than 40 AU, Alicanto is an extreme trans-Neptunian object which are practically detached from Neptune's gravitational influence. Its orbit is characterized by high eccentricity (0.850), moderate inclination (25.58°) and a semi-major axis of 316 AU. Upon discovery, it was classified as a trans-Neptunian object. Its orbit is well determined; as of 11 January 2017 its orbital solution is based on 34 observations spanning a data-arc of 5821 days.

Naming 

On 14 May 2021, the object was named by the Working Group Small Body Nomenclature (WGSBN) after Alicanto from Chilean mythology. The nocturnal bird of the Atacama Desert has wings that shine at night with beautiful, metallic colors.

Physical characteristics 

Alicanto has an absolute magnitude of 6.5 which gives a characteristic diameter of 130 to 300 km for an assumed albedo in the range 0.25–0.05.

Michael Brown's website lists it as a possible dwarf planet with a diameter of  based on an assumed albedo of 0.04. The albedo is expected to be low because the object has a blue (neutral) color. However, if the albedo is higher, the object could easily be half that size.

Alicanto visible spectrum is very different from that of 90377 Sedna. The value of its spectral slope suggests that the surface of this object can have pure methane ices (like in the case of Pluto) and highly processed carbons, including some amorphous silicates.

Relevance to the Planet Nine Hypothesis 

This minor planet is one of a number of objects discovered in the Solar System to have a semi-major axis > 150 AU, a perihelion beyond Neptune, and an argument of perihelion of 340 ± 55°. Of these, only eight, including Alicanto, have perihelia beyond Neptune's current influence.

Comparison

See also 
 List of Solar System objects by greatest aphelion

References

External links 
 New data about two distant asteroids give a clue to the possible "Planet Nine"
 Dos asteroides lejanos apoyan la hipótesis del Planeta Nueve
 
 

474640
474640
Discoveries by Andrew C. Becker
Named minor planets
20041106